Jonathan Joseph Candido (December 25, 1913 – May 19, 1999) was an American radio performer and voice actor. He was best remembered for his famous line "I'm feeling mighty low".

Early and personal life
Born on Christmas Day in 1913 in New Orleans, Louisiana, Candido, who later used the legal name John B. Candido, was a bassist and vocalist in Ted Fio Rito's big band, and they can be seen in a Soundie, "Ma, He's Making Eyes at Me". He was a childhood friend of Louis Prima, becoming part of his band in 1924. In 1933, he married Anita Bivona.

Career

Radio 
Candido's distinctive, four-octave speaking voice became familiar to radio listeners and moviegoers. Speaking his lines in his normal tenor, he would suddenly adopt a high, squeaky soprano and just as suddenly plunge into a gruff bass. His weekly repetition of "I'm feeling mighty low" on Jimmy Durante's radio show made it a national catchphrase. The running gag became so familiar that he recorded a song of the same title with Durante. The line can be heard in the 1950 Bugs Bunny cartoon Homeless Hare, although it was not spoken there by Candido.

Voices 
Candido provided the voice of an angry apple tree in The Wizard of Oz (1939), and provided the voice of a skeleton in Abbott and Costello in the Foreign Legion, and he later teamed with Bud Abbott during Abbott's attempted comeback in 1960. He was the voice of the bear in the Gentle Ben TV series, and he worked as a voice actor on animated films, notably for Walt Disney, where he portrayed the voice of the Indian Chief in Peter Pan (1953), one of Maleficent's goons in Sleeping Beauty (1959), the Captain of the Guard the crocodile in Robin Hood (1973), and the deep voiced prisoner in the Haunted Mansion attraction. Other animated films with Candido voices include Chuck Jones' adaptation of The Phantom Tollbooth (1970), and the Ralph Bakshi movies Hey Good Lookin' and Heavy Traffic. His final and personal favorite role was as Fidget the peg-legged bat in The Great Mouse Detective (1986).

Films 
His various credited and uncredited roles as an actor, bassist and vocalist in live-action films include Sadie McKee (1934), Roberta (1935), Only Angels Have Wings (1939), The Wizard of Oz (1939), Rhythm Parade (1942), Campus Rhythm (1943), Sarge Goes to College (1947), Smart Politics (1948), and The Great Rupert (1950).

Recording 
Candido recorded a few children's 78 RPM records for Capitol Records:
 CAS-3105 - Side One "I'm Popeye the Sailor Man", Side Two "The Little White Duck" (1952)
 CAS-3156 - Side One "You're Nothin' But a Nothin'", Side Two "Barnacle Bill the Sailor" (1953)

Death
Candido died from natural causes in his sleep at the age of 85 on May 19, 1999, in his home in Burbank, California. He was survived by his wife Anita, four children, eight grandchildren, seven great-grandchildren, and two great-great-grandchildren. He was interred in San Fernando Mission Cemetery.

Filmography

 Sadie McKee (1934) – Candy of 'Coco and Candy' – Bass Player
 Roberta (1935) – Candy – Trick-voiced Wabash Indianian (uncredited)
 Broadway Gondolier (1935) – Candy (uncredited)
 Mama Steps Out (1937) – Bosco (uncredited)
 Something to Sing About (1937) – Candy (bassist in the band)
 Cowboy from Brooklyn (1938) – Spec
 Charlie Cuckoo (1939) – Charlie Cuckoo (voice, uncredited)
 Only Angels Have Wings (1939) – Bass Player (uncredited)
 The Wizard of Oz (1939) – Angry Apple Tree (voice, uncredited)
 A Haunting We Will Go (1939) – Papa Ghost (voice, uncredited)
 A Squirt in Time (1940) – Cylinder (voice, uncredited)
 Heart of the Rio Grande (1942) – Basso dubbing for Frog and Tadpole (uncredited)
 Rhythm Parade (1942) – Candy
 Campus Rhythm (1943) – Harold
 Sarge Goes to College (1947) – Bass and Vocals, The Jam Session
 Smart Politics (1948) – Alvin, Peabody's Nephew
 The Great Rupert (1950) – Molineri – Florist
 Riding High (1950) – Musician (uncredited)
 Abbott and Costello in the Foreign Legion (1950) – Skeleton (voice, uncredited)
 Peter Pan (1953) – Indian Chief (voice)
 King Creole (1958) – King Creole Doorman (uncredited)
 Plunderers of Painted Flats (1959) – Bartender
 Sleeping Beauty (1959) – Maleficent's Goon / Diablo (voice, uncredited)
 Babes in Toyland (1961) – Trees (voice, uncredited)
 The Phantom Tollbooth (1970) – Awful DYNN (voice)
 Heavy Traffic (1973) – The Mafia Messenger (voice)
 Robin Hood (1973) – Captain of the Guards (voice, uncredited)
 Herbie Rides Again (1974) – (voice)
 Hey Good Lookin' (1982) – Sal (voice) 
 The Great Mouse Detective (1986) – Fidget / Bar Patron (voice)
 Mighty Mouse: The New Adventures (1987) – (voice)

References

External links
 
 Behind The Voice Actors

1913 births
1999 deaths
20th-century American male actors
20th-century American musicians
American jazz musicians
American male radio actors
American male voice actors
American people of Italian descent
Burials at San Fernando Mission Cemetery
Animal impersonators
Disney people
Jazz musicians from New Orleans